HOOP is an official NBA publication, produced by Professional Sports Publications. The magazine features in-depth interviews with players, and also highlights the players' lives off the court. 

Other popular sections include celebrity interviews and Dance Life. 

Los Angeles Lakers guard Steve Nash answers readers' questions in his "Straight Shooter" column. Golden State Warriors guard Nate Robinson is the player video game editor and Miami Heat forward Shane Battier serves as Tech Editor and reviews products online for hoopmag.com.

HOOP also publishes international editions such as HOOP Japan, which features basketball English lessons from English, baby!.

NBA player contributors

Current columnists

Miami Heat forward Shane Battier (Tech editor)
Indiana Pacers forward Danny Granger (Movie editor)
Atlanta Hawks guard Devin Harris (Car editor)
New Orleans Hornets forward Carl Landry (Music editor)
Los Angeles Lakers guard  Steve Nash (Straight Shooter)
Atlanta Hawks center Zaza Pachulia (Fashion editor)
Chicago Bulls guard Nate Robinson (Video Game editor)
Former Indiana Pacers guard Jalen Rose (Fab 5 column)
Minnesota Lynx guard Candice Wiggins (Fashion editor)
Philadelphia 76ers forward Thaddeus Young (Music editor)

Former columnists

 Morris Almond (Rookie columnist, 2008)
NBA Hall of Famer Rick Barry
Former San Antonio Spurs forward Bruce Bowen (Defensive editor, 2007-08)
Former Orlando Magic center Adonal Foyle (Book reviewer)
Phoenix Suns center  Channing Frye (Straight Shooter)
Former Orlando Magic forward Pat Garrity (Straight Shooter, 2007-08)
Former Houston Rockets guard Kenny Smith (Fashion editor, 2007)
New Jersey Nets guard Deron Williams (Car editor, 2008)

References

External links
HOOP Magazine

Basketball magazines
Bimonthly magazines published in the United States
Magazines established in 1971
Magazines published in New York City
National Basketball Association mass media
Sports magazines published in the United States